Oberbarmen is the eastern terminal of the Wuppertal Schwebebahn; it is located in the Barmen area of Wuppertal. The terminal consists of two buildings, the station proper and the depot with the loop for the train to turn around. The depot holds trains during the night. The buildings are suspended above the Wupper and separated by a bridge, the Wupperbrücke Berliner Platz. The main works for maintenance and repair are at the Vohwinkel Schwebebahn terminal.

The Oberbarmen station is at kilometer 13.3 of the Schwebebahn track.

Next to the Schwebebahn station is the Wuppertal-Oberbarmen station of the railway, along with bus links to surrounding areas.

References 

Wuppertal Schwebebahn
Monorail stations
Railway stations in Wuppertal